The Musée national de la Marine in Rochefort is one of the main naval museums of France.

Rochefort Naval museum is part of the Musée national de la Marine, which is organised around its main location in Paris, and it antennas in Rochefort, Toulon, Brest and Port-Louis.

Gallery

Notes and references

External links 
  Official website

Museums in Charente-Maritime
Naval museums
Maritime museums in France
Rochefort, Charente-Maritime